Modern Language Notes (MLN) is a peer-reviewed academic journal established in 1886 at the Johns Hopkins University, with the intention of introducing continental European literary criticism into American scholarship. The journal is published five times per year, with one issue covering each of the four languages of concern (French, German, Italian, Spanish), while the fifth issue focuses on comparative literature. Each issue has its own specific sets of editors.

Abstracting and indexing
The journal is abstracted and indexed in:

References

External links 

Literary magazines published in the United States
Modernism
Literary criticism
Publications established in 1886
Johns Hopkins University Press academic journals
Multilingual journals
5 times per year journals